Spectrum: The Best In Contemporary Fantastic Art is a large full color book series which showcases fantasy, science fiction, and horror-themed art in eight categories as selected by a rotating jury from an annual competition.

History 
Spectrum was initially conceived by Arnie Fenner and Cathy Fenner. Inspired by the popularity of Tomorrow and Beyond, an image anthology edited by Ian Summers in 1978, the annual publication from The Society of Illustrators, and with very successful exhibitions devoted to fantastic art at the New Britain Museum of American Art (1980), and at the Society of Illustrators (1984), the Fenners decided that a volume focusing on the popular genre was justified.
 
A Call For Entries was mailed to the arts community and a jury of professional artists convened to make selections from the work submitted in Initially six categories: Advertising, Book, Comics, Editorial, Institutional, and Unpublished; the results appeared in the first full color book, Spectrum 1, published by Underwood Books in 1994. Later two additional categories were added: Dimensional and Concept Art. A new installment in the Spectrum series has appeared every year since. Underwood Books produced the first twenty volumes.

Feature articles and reviews have been written about the series in such industry publications such as Locus, Realms of Fantasy and Airbrush Art & Action as well as general publications such as the Kansas City Star newspaper and The Post Newspapers - Medina Edition 
 
In 2013, the Fenners semi-retired and licensed the competition and book to John Fleskes, who continues to edit and publish the series under the Flesk Publications imprint.

Awards

Spectrum has had nominations for, and has won, many industry awards over its history. Among them are:

Won the Locus Award for Art Book.

Nominated for the Hugo Award for best Nonfiction Book.

Won the Chesley Award for Art Direction.

Won the World Fantasy Award for Special Award, Professional.

The Selection Process 
 
Every year, a Call For Entries poster is sent out to anyone who requests it; a different popular illustrator provides the poster art each year. Among past poster artists are Frank Frazetta, Phil Hale, Rebecca Guay, and Brom.  Notice of the competition is also made via the internet, social media and through email. Submissions are made to the website in digital form by an announced deadline.
 
A jury of award-winning artists and art directors physically assembles in Kansas City to view and judge the submissions rather than have them vote in isolation from home via the internet.
 
The jury casts anonymous votes on all of the submissions and simultaneously nominates works for award consideration; a group discussion follows the conclusion of voting to present a Gold and a Silver award in each category.  Artworks that receive a simple majority of votes—3 out of 5—are included in the book.
 
All artists selected for publication receive a copy of the book at no expense to them; Spectrum was the first annual to give each included artist a book.

Spectrum Fantastic Art Live! 
 
The Spectrum series also inspired a semi-annual event, Spectrum Fantastic Art Live! (SFAL) beginning in 2012 in Kansas City, MO. Intended as a combination convention/art fair for the fantasy and science fiction art community, it has attracted artists, industry professionals and fans from around the world.
 
The event features booths and tables for artists to sell originals and prints to the public along with programming that includes panel discussions, workshops, live painting demonstrations, and portfolio reviews by art directors from the book, comics, gaming, and entertainment industries. The Spectrum Awards have also been presented at an evening ceremony during the convention.

In 2019 Spectrum Fantastic Art Live! Collaborated with Planet Comicon Kansas City, one of the midwest's largest pop-culture conventions, for the event.

Spectrum Fantastic Art Live! Commemorative Book
The first Spectrum Fantastic Art Live! was held in Kansas City, Missouri, May 18-20, 2012. A commemorative hardcover book showcasing the art of the five special guests was produced.

THE  VOLUMES

SPECTRUM 1

SPECTRUM 1 Awards

SPECTRUM 2

SPECTRUM 2 Awards

SPECTRUM 3

SPECTRUM 3 Awards

SPECTRUM 4

SPECTRUM 4 Awards

SPECTRUM 5

SPECTRUM 5 Awards

SPECTRUM 6

SPECTRUM 6 Awards

SPECTRUM 7

SPECTRUM 7 Awards

SPECTRUM 8

SPECTRUM 8 Awards

SPECTRUM 9

SPECTRUM 9 Awards

SPECTRUM 10

SPECTRUM 10 Awards

SPECTRUM 11

SPECTRUM 11 Awards

SPECTRUM 12

SPECTRUM 12 Awards

SPECTRUM 13

SPECTRUM 13 Awards

SPECTRUM 14

SPECTRUM 14 Awards

SPECTRUM 15

SPECTRUM 15 Awards

SPECTRUM 16

SPECTRUM 16 Awards

SPECTRUM 17

SPECTRUM 17 Awards

SPECTRUM 18

SPECTRUM 18 Awards

SPECTRUM 19

SPECTRUM 19 Awards

SPECTRUM 20

SPECTRUM 20 Awards

SPECTRUM 21

SPECTRUM 21 Awards

SPECTRUM 22

SPECTRUM 22 Awards

SPECTRUM 23

SPECTRUM 23 Awards

SPECTRUM 24

SPECTRUM 24 Awards

SPECTRUM 25

SPECTRUM 25 Awards

References

Horror fiction